The Diving Competition at the 1998 Commonwealth Games in Kuala Lumpur, Malaysia counted a total number of six medal events: three events for both men and women.

Men's Results

1m Springboard
Held on 18 September 1998

3m Springboard
Held on 19 September 1998

10m Platform
Held on 20 September 1998

Women's Results

1m Springboard
Held on 18 September 1998

3m Springboard
Held on 20 September 1998

10m Platform
Held on 19 September 1998

See also
 Diving at the 1996 Summer Olympics
 Diving at the 2000 Summer Olympics

References
 Results

1998
1998 in water sports
1998 Commonwealth Games events